Seur was a Spanish professional cycling team that existed from 1988 to 1992. It was sponsored by Spanish transport company . Marco Giovannetti won the general classification of the 1990 Vuelta a España with the team.

References

Cycling teams based in Spain
Defunct cycling teams based in Spain
1988 establishments in Spain
1992 disestablishments in Spain
Cycling teams established in 1988
Cycling teams disestablished in 1992